Kehl is a habitational surname from various places so named. Notable people with the surname include:

Bryan Kehl, American Football player
Fritz Kehl, Swiss soccer player
Jason Kehl, American rock climber
John Kehl, American politician
Sebastian Kehl, German soccer player
Tony Kehl, American college football coach
Jozef Kehl, Slovak jazz/jazz fusion bassist

German toponymic surnames